Bogdan Alexandru Mitrea (born 29 September 1987) is a Romanian professional footballer who plays as a centre-back for Liga I side CS Universitatea Craiova.

Career statistics

Club

International

International goals

Honours
SESO Iara
Liga IV – Cluj County: 2007–08

Studențesc Iași
Liga II: 2011–12

Sepsi OSK 
Cupa României: 2021–22
Supercupa României: 2022

Individual
Liga I Team of the Season: 2020–21

References

External links

1987 births
Living people
Sportspeople from Cluj-Napoca
Romanian footballers
Romania international footballers
Association football defenders
Liga I players
Liga II players
Liga III players
CSM Câmpia Turzii players
FC Politehnica Iași (2010) players
FC Viitorul Constanța players
FC Steaua București players
Sepsi OSK Sfântu Gheorghe players
CS Universitatea Craiova players
Serie B players
Ascoli Calcio 1898 F.C. players
Cypriot First Division players
AEL Limassol players
Doxa Katokopias FC players
FC Spartak Trnava players
Slovak Super Liga players
Romanian expatriate footballers
Romanian expatriate sportspeople in Italy
Expatriate footballers in Italy
Romanian expatriate sportspeople in Cyprus
Expatriate footballers in Cyprus
Romanian expatriate sportspeople in Slovakia
Expatriate footballers in Slovakia